Macro-Arawakan is a proposed language family of South America and the Caribbean centered on the Arawakan languages. Sometimes, the proposal is called Arawakan, and the central family is called Maipurean.

Proposals
Kaufman (1990) includes the following:

Arawakan (Maipurean)
Arawan
Guajiboan
Candoshi

Payne (1991) and Derbyshire (1992) have:
Arawakan (Maipurean)
Arawan
Guajiboan
Puquina
Harakmbet

Jolkesky (2016) argues for the following:
Arawakan (Maipurean)
Candoshi
Puquina
Munichi

According to Jolkesky (op. cit., 611-616), the proto-Macro-Arawakan language would have been spoken in the Middle Ucayali River Basin during the beginning of the 2nd millennium BCE, and its speakers would have produced Tutishcainyo pottery in the region.

Martins (2005: 342–370) groups the Arawakan and Nadahup languages together as part of a proposed Makúan-Arawakan (Nadahup-Arawakan) family, but this proposal has been rejected by Aikhenvald (2006: 237).

Carvalho (2021) notes that the Arawakan and Arawan families have had significant long-term mutual interaction, but does not consider the two language families to be related. According to Carvalho (2021), the Juruá-Purus linguistic corridor had facilitated the migration of Arawakan speakers to the southern fringes of the Amazon basin.

Pronouns
Pronominal system of the Macro-Arawakan languages:

{| class=wikitable
|-
! language !! I !! you (sg) !! he/she/it !! we !! you (pl) !! they
|-
! Proto-Arawakan
| *nu/*ni- || *pɨ- || *tʰu || *wi/*wa- || *hi- || *ra- 
|-
! Munichi
| -nɨ/-ɲɨ || -pɨ || -  || -wɨ  || -di  || -ra ‘3’  
|-
! Puquina
| no, -ni-; || po, -p-, -pi || ʧu, -su- || - || - || -
|-
! Candoshi
| no || - || su- || ija, iː || si || -
|-
! Yanesha'
| na, no, ne || pʲa, pʲo, pe || - || ja, jo, je || sa, so, se || -
|-
! Aguachile
| ni || pi || - || waʔaha || - || -
|}

Lexicon
Several words in the basic lexicon of the Macro-Arawakan languages were pointed out as possible cognates:

{| class=wikitable
|-
! language !! father !!  eye !!  neck !! hair !! bone !! firewood !! dung !! sleep !! die !! house !! tooth !! stone !! water !! sky
|-
! Proto-Arawakan
| *apa || *uke || *ʧano || *si || *napɨ || *tsɨma || *itika || *maka || *kama || *pana, *ponku || *ahtse || *kʰiba || *uni || *enu
|-
! Munichi
| – || ukɨ (head) ||– || uɕi || – || ʧu(-sɨ) ('fire') || kʲa || – || kma || hna || di || –  || idɨ  || –
|-
! Puquina
|  – ||juqe ||– || – || – || – || – || miha || – || – || – || – || unu || haniɡo ('high')
|-
! Candoshi
| apaː ||– ||ʂano || ʃi || nap ||  somaː-si ('fire') || ʧikaː || makija || – || paNkoː || nas || – || – || kaniːNta
|-
! Yanesha'
| apa ||– ||ʧnoːpʲ || ʃe || napo || ʦoːm || tʲoʔj || -maʔ || ʐomu || pokoːlʲ || ahs || – || onʲ || enet
|-
! Aguachile
|  – ||– || asanu || – || – || – || – || – || – || pani(ʃi) || asi || ipa || – || enui
|}

References

Bibliography

 Aikhenvald, Alexandra Y. (1999). The Arawak language family. In R. M. W. Dixon & A. Y. Aikhenvald (Eds.), The Amazonian languages. Cambridge: Cambridge University Press. ; .
 Campbell, Lyle. (1997). American Indian languages: The historical linguistics of Native America. New York: Oxford University Press. .
 Jolkesky, Marcelo. (2016). Estudo arqueo-ecolinguístico das terras tropicais sul-americanas. Brasilia: UnB. PhD Dissertation. Available here.
 Kaufman, Terrence. (1994). The native languages of South America. In C. Mosley & R. E. Asher (Eds.), Atlas of the world's languages (pp. 46–76). London: Routledge.
 Payne, David. (1991). A classification of Maipuran (Arawakan) languages based on shared lexical retentions. In D. C. Derbyshire & G. K. Pullum (Eds.), Handbook of Amazonian languages (Vol. 3, pp. 355–499). Berlin: Mouton de Gruyter.
 Derbyshire, Desmond C. (1992). Arawakan languages. In W. Bright (Ed.), International encyclopedia of linguistics (Vol. 1, pp. 102–105). New Oxford: Oxford University Press.
 Kaufman, Terrence. (1990). Language history in South America: What we know and how to know more. In D. L. Payne (Ed.), Amazonian linguistics: Studies in lowland South American languages (pp. 13–67). Austin: University of Texas Press. .
 Migliazza, Ernest C.; & Campbell, Lyle. (1988). Panorama general de las lenguas indígenas en América (pp. 223). Historia general de América (Vol. 10). Caracas: Instituto Panamericano de Geografía e Historia.
 Byrne, James. (1885). General principles of the structure of language – Grammatical Sktches: Arawak (pp. 198 ff)
 Brinton, D. G., (1871). The Arawak Language of Guiana in its Linguistic and Ethnological Relations Philadelphia: McCalla & Stavely. (pp. 18)

External links
 Etnolingüística: online resources on native South American languages

 
Proposed language families